Megan Hall (born 5 March 1974 in Pietermaritzburg) is a triathlete from South Africa.

Hall competed at the second Olympic triathlon at the 2004 Summer Olympics.  She took thirty-sixth place with a total time of 2:16:26.53.

References
 Profile

1974 births
Living people
South African female triathletes
Olympic triathletes of South Africa
Triathletes at the 2004 Summer Olympics
Sportspeople from Pietermaritzburg
20th-century South African women
21st-century South African women